The 2019 Charlottesville Men's Pro Challenger was a professional tennis tournament played on indoor hard courts. It was the eleventh edition of the tournament which was part of the 2019 ATP Challenger Tour, taking place in Charlottesville, United States from October 28 to November 3, 2019.

Singles main-draw entrants

Seeds

 1 Rankings are as of 21 October 2019.

Other entrants
The following players received wildcards into the singles main draw:
  Brandon Nakashima
  Govind Nanda
  Alex Rybakov
  Raymond Sarmiento
  Carl Söderlund

The following players received entry into the singles main draw as alternates:
  Gianni Ross
  Evan Song

The following players received entry from the qualifying draw:
  Liam Caruana
  Jacob Dunbar

The following player received entry as a lucky loser:
  Dennis Novikov

Champions

Singles

 Vasek Pospisil def.  Brayden Schnur 7–6(7–2), 3–6, 6–2.

Doubles

 Mitchell Krueger /  Blaž Rola def.  Sekou Bangoura /  Blaž Kavčič 6–4, 6–1.

References

2019 ATP Challenger Tour
2019
2019 in American tennis
2019 in sports in Virginia
October 2019 sports events in the United States
November 2019 sports events in the United States